J.H.A.Agarsen College (Jayagovind Harigopal Agarwal Agarsen College), commonly known as JHA, is a Liberal arts, commerce and science college in Chennai, India. It is affiliated with the University of Madras.

Jayagovind Harigopal Agarwal Agarsen College was established by Harigopal Agarwal through Agarwal Relief and Educational Trust consisting, the philanthropic Agarwal Community (Chennai) in the academic year 2000-2001 at Madhavaram.

The College 
The College has 10 UG and 3 PG programmes. Research Programmes such as M.Phil, (Commerce) has become part of the academic curriculum.

Motto 
''Vidhya Vindate Amirtham''

Academics 
The campus with all the necessary infrastructure, spacious classrooms, air – conditioned UG & PG Computer labs, 1600 students and  65  faculty and staff members, education  is incorporated in collaboration with computer career organizations. Under the scheme, the students perform data processing work after college hours.

National Social Service 
NSS units of which is for both the girls and boys students, which serves the nation at Independent level. College also mentioned some other activities such as

 Lord Shiva Temple in the Campus
 "Annadanam" on every Amavasai
 Adoption of Theeyambakkam Village on Manali road
 Leprosy Awareness Programmes
 Literacy Awareness Programmes
 Aids Awareness Camps
 Free Eye Camps & General Medical Check – up
 SIFE (Students in Free Enterprise)

Courses offered 
UG Courses

PG Courses

References

External links 
 Official website
 Colleges to launch B.Com in Tamil medium

 
Educational institutions established in 2000
Colleges affiliated to University of Madras
Arts and Science colleges in Chennai
2000 establishments in Tamil Nadu